Dorridge Wood is a park and local nature reserve in Dorridge, Solihull, West Midlands. Established after a land donation in 1969, it incorporates a woodland area first mentioned in 1556. The park is home to many species of flora and fauna: Scots Pine, oak and ash trees, various wildflowers. Mammals including fox and vole have been sighted.

The open spaces around the woodlands are open to grass and include for football pitches and a children's playground.

See also
 List of local nature reserves in England

References

Local Nature Reserves in the West Midlands (county)
Country parks in the West Midlands (county)
Solihull
1969 establishments in England